Uberaba Sport Club is a traditional Brazilian football club from Uberaba, Minas Gerais state. Their colors are red and white and their nicknames are "Colorado" and "Zebu" (mascot of the team and symbol of the city of Uberaba).

History
The club was founded on July 15, 1917. They won the Campeonato Mineiro Módulo II in 2003, and the Taça Minas Gerais in 1980, 2009, and in 2010.

Achievements
Campeonato Mineiro Módulo II: 1
2003
Campeonato Mineiro Segunda Divisão: 2
2015, 2021
Taça Minas Gerais: 3
1980, 2009, 2010

External links
 Official website 
 Uberaba Sport Club at Arquivo de Clubes 

 
Association football clubs established in 1917
Football clubs in Minas Gerais
1917 establishments in Brazil